North Dakota has held two statewide elections in 2020: a primary election on Tuesday, June 9, and a general election on Tuesday, November 3. In addition, each township has elected officers on Tuesday, March 17, and each school district held their elections on a date of their choosing between April 1 and June 30.

Primary Election
On Tuesday, June 9, North Dakota voters will select which candidates for statewide and legislative office will appear on the November ballot. Because North Dakota does not have party registration, any eligible voter may vote in any one party's primary election. In addition, any number of constitutional amendments, initiated measures, or referred measures may be placed on the ballot by petition or legislative action.

The State of North Dakota does not provide for a presidential primary, but the Democratic–NPL Party has held a firehouse caucus on March 10, 2020, to select delegates to the Democratic National Convention. , the Republican Party has yet to announce plans for selecting delegates to the Republican National Convention.

General Election
On Tuesday, November 3, concurrent with other statewide elections across the United States, North Dakota voters will select three electors to the United States Electoral College to elect the President of the United States, one United States Representative to represent North Dakota's at-large congressional district, their Governor (alongside Lieutenant Governor), and a number of other statewide executive and judicial officials. Voters who live in even-numbered legislative districts will also select their representatives to the North Dakota House of Representatives and North Dakota Senate. Finally, voters may face any number of constitutional amendments, initiated measures, or referred measures placed on the ballot by petition.

Federal offices

United States President

North Dakota voters will select a presidential candidate on their ballots; the candidate with the most votes will send their preselected electors to represent North Dakota in the Electoral College. The state of North Dakota has three electoral votes in the Electoral College, and so will send three electors.

United States Representative

Freshman incumbent Republican Kelly Armstrong ran for re-election.

State offices

Governor and Lieutenant Governor 

Republican incumbent Governor Doug Burgum and Lieutenant Governor Brent Sanford, both serving their first terms in statewide elected office, ran together for re-election.

State Treasurer
Incumbent Republican Kelly Schmidt, the longest serving Treasurer in the state's history, announced she would not seek re-election in 2020. In the primary, State Representative Thomas Beadle was elected to fill the open seat.

State Auditor
In the State Auditor race, incumbent Republican Josh Gallion, who provoked lawmakers' ire with his reviews in his first term, ran for re-election.

Polling

Result

Insurance Commissioner
In the election for Insurance Commissioner, incumbent Republican Jon Godfread ran for re-election unopposed.

Superintendent of Public Instruction
The election for Superintendent of Public Instruction in North Dakota is nonpartisan. Incumbent Kirsten Baesler, who is a registered Republican, ran for re-election.

Public Service Commissioner
One of three seats in the state Public Service Commission went up for election. Incumbent Republican Brian Kroshus ran for re-election to a full six-year term.

Justice of the Supreme Court
Chief Justice Jon J. Jensen ran unopposed in a nonpartisan election to a ten-year term.

State legislative races

23 seats in the North Dakota Senate and 47 seats in the North Dakota House of Representatives are up for election. Voters in all even-numbered districts will see those races on their ballots. The outcome of this election could affect partisan balance during post-census redistricting.

Among the candidates for the North Dakota House, Republican candidate David Andahl who died due to COVID-19 in October 2020 had eventually won a seat in the North Dakota House of Representatives.

Measures
Voters will face any number of constitutional measures and statutes initiated or referred to the ballot by petition.

Measure 1
Polling

Result

Measure 2
Polling

Result

Notes

Partisan clients

References

External links
 Vote.ND.gov, the official North Dakota Secretary of State election information portal
 
 
  (State affiliate of the U.S. League of Women Voters)
 

 
North Dakota